is a former Japanese professional sumo wrestler from Asahikawa, Hokkaidō. He made his professional debut in 1957, reaching the top makuuchi division in 1964. He was the sport's 52nd yokozuna, a rank he attained in 1970. He won ten tournament championships and was known for his rivalry with Tamanoumi. He retired in 1974 and was the head coach of Kokonoe stable from 1977 to 1992. He left the Japan Sumo Association in 1998 but is still prominent in the sumo world as a commentator as of 2021.

Career
Kitanofuji began his professional career in January 1957 at the age of just 14, joining Dewanoumi stable. In November 1963 he achieved a perfect 15–0 score in the second highest jūryō division (a feat not equalled until 43 years later by Baruto) and was promoted to the top makuuchi division. In his debut top division tournament in January 1964 he scored 13 wins, although he faced only his fellow maegashira. He won the Fighting Spirit award and was promoted straight to komusubi. By 1966 he was firmly established in the san'yaku ranks at sekiwake. He reached ōzeki rank in July 1966. Although he had won only 28 bouts in the previous three tournaments (at least 33 are normally needed), Yutakayama was the only ōzeki at the time, and he was promoted largely because of his potential.

In January 1967 he followed the coach who had scouted him, former yokozuna Chiyonoyama, to a new stable, Kokonoe. His first tournament championship came in March of that year. Kitanofuji was competing in an era dominated by Taihō, but he emerged from the great yokozuna's shadow by winning consecutive championships in November 1969 and January 1970 to secure his own promotion to yokozuna. Promoted alongside him was his friend and rival Tamanoumi. His first title as a yokozuna came in May 1970. After a run of relatively mediocre 11–4 marks he won in May 1971 with a perfect record and he took two other championships that year.

However, Tamanoumi's sudden death in October 1971 shook Kitanofuji badly and affected his performance in the ring. Now the sole yokozuna in sumo, he went into a slump. After poor performances in the first two tournaments of 1972, he pulled out of the May 1972 tourney because of insomnia. He took a leave of absence from the next tournament in July, but went on a trip to Hawaii and was caught surfboarding. He was cautioned by the Japan Sumo Association and immediately apologised. He returned to win the next championship with a perfect record in September 1972. His final title came in March 1973, and his last challenge for a championship was in July of that year when he lost a playoff to veteran Kotozakura.

After several more absences Kitanofuji announced his retirement at the age of 32 three days into the July 1974 tournament, acknowledging that there was now a new era being led by Wajima and Kitanoumi, both several years younger than himself. Kotozakura retired in the same week, and Kitanoumi was promoted to yokozuna after the tournament ended. Kitanofuji's total of ten tournament championships was, at the time, behind only Futabayama's 12 and Taiho's 32.

Retirement from sumo
Kitanofuji remained in the Japan Sumo Association after his retirement, initially under the name of Izutsu. Shortly after retiring he branched out and set up his own Izutsu stable. In 1977, however, he became head of the Kokonoe stable of wrestlers following Chiyonoyama's death, and merged his stable back into Kokonoe. He gave the Izutsu name to former sekiwake Tsurugamine and adopted the Kokonoe name. During his tenure as head of Kokonoe stable both Chiyonofuji and Hokutoumi reached the rank of yokozuna, and he produced a number of other top division wrestlers such as Takanofuji and Tomoefuji.  He handed over control of the stable to Chiyonofuji in April 1992, but he remained an oyakata under the name Jinmaku. In September 1993 he left Kokonoe stable and joined his former wrestler Hokutoumi's newly established Hakkaku stable. In February 1998 he failed to be re-elected to the Sumo Association's Board of Directors, and citing the lack of support from his fellow oyakata in the Takasago ichimon or group of stables, he decided to leave the organisation several years before the mandatory retirement age. However, he still often appears on television as a sumo analyst for NHK. In 2002, he performed his kanreki dohyō-iri or '60th year ring entrance ceremony' to commemorate his years as yokozuna. In January 2017 he took a break from sumo commentary in order to recuperate from heart surgery. As of 2023 he is still an NHK commentator at the age of 80, remaining in the public eye despite being outside of the Sumo Association for many years.

Fighting style
Kitanofuji's favoured grip were hidari-yotsu (a right hand outside, left hand inside grip on his opponent's mawashi), and his favoured techniques  were yori. His most common kimarite (winning techniques) were yorikiri (force out), sotogake (outer leg trip), uwatenage (overarm throw), and hatakikomi (slap down).

Career record
The Nagoya tournament was first held in 1958.

See also
Glossary of sumo terms
Kanreki dohyo-iri
List of past sumo wrestlers
List of sumo tournament top division champions
List of sumo tournament top division runners-up
List of sumo tournament second division champions
List of yokozuna

References

External links

Kitanofuji Katsuaki on goo Sumo
Kitanofuji Column

1942 births
Living people
Japanese sumo wrestlers
People from Asahikawa
Sumo people from Hokkaido
Yokozuna
Kokonoe stable sumo wrestlers